Jacques Andreani (November 22, 1929 – July 25, 2015) was French ambassador to Egypt, Italy and the United States.

Early life and Career
Jacques Andreani was born in Paris.
He graduated from the Sciences Po, ENA.
From there, after working one year in Paris to learn basic Russian and to study Eastern European problems, he was assigned to Moscow, where he stayed during some of the most difficult periods of the Cold War – the construction of the Berlin wall and the 1962 Cuban Missile Crisis.
He taught at the University of Clermont-Ferrand from 1996 to 1997, at The Johns Hopkins University SAIS Bologna Center from 1997 to 1998, and at LUISS, from 2000 to 2005.

Chronological order of positions held
 Embassy Secretary at the French Embassy, Washington, D.C.
 Assistant Permanent Representative to NATO in 1970.
 Director of European Affairs in the French Foreign Ministry, from 1975 to 1979.
 Ambassador to Egypt from 1979 to 1981.
 Ambassador to Italy from 1984 to 1988.
 Ambassador to the United States, from 1989 to October 1995.
 Visiting Lecturer of Law and Political Science from 2000 to 2010.

Awards & Distinctions
  Commander of the Order of the Polar Star
 Commandeur de la Légion d’Honneur
 Commandeur l’Ordre national du Mérite
 Commander of the Order of Merit of the Federal Republic of Germany (Verdienstorden der Bundesrepublik Deutschland)

Associations
 President of the [United States] section of the French-American Association
 Honorary President of the Dante Alighieri society Munich, Germany.
 Honorary President of the Alumni Association of the  Sciences-Po.
 Member of the Trilateral Commission,
 Member of the "Club Monaco", a private institution that brings together political, diplomatic groups.

Works

References

External links
 http://www.projetaladin.org/holocaust/tr/konumaya-cesaret-ettiler/Mr.-Jacques-Andreani.html
 https://web.archive.org/web/20111002035107/http://forum-network.org/speaker/jacques-andreani

1929 births
2015 deaths
French diplomats
Sciences Po alumni
École nationale d'administration alumni
Commandeurs of the Légion d'honneur
Ambassadors of France to Egypt
Ambassadors of France to Italy
Ambassadors of France to the United States